Demon in the Bottle is a 1996 American-Romanian adventure-fantasy film, co-written and directed by Randall William Cook and starred by Ashley Tesoro, Michael Malota and Rahi Azizi.

Plot
After accidentally falling into a secret cave, four kids find a treasure guarded by a genius in a bottle. They inadvertently release the ancient creature and have to find a way to return it to the bottle and spare their own lives.

Cast
 Ashley Tesoro as Amanda
 Michael Malota as Russell
 Rahi Azizi as Freddy
 Michael Dubrow as Marvin
 Michael Walters as Creature / Cannonball Catcher
 Franklin A. Vallette as Bald Pirate
 Randall William Cook as Pirate Captain / Mr. Lambert / Voice of the Guardian

References

External links
 
 

1996 films
1990s fantasy adventure films
Full Moon Features films